Green Township is one of ten townships in Marshall County, Indiana, United States. As of the 2010 census, its population was 1,103 and it contained 419 housing units.

Green Township was established in 1836.

Geography

Cities, towns, villages
 Argos (west quarter)

Lakes
 Eddy Lake
 Mud Lake

Major highways

Education
 Argos Community Schools

Green Township residents may obtain a free library card from the Argos Public Library in Argos.

Political districts
 Indiana's 2nd congressional district
 State House District 17
 State Senate District 5

References
 
 United States Census Bureau 2008 TIGER/Line Shapefiles
 IndianaMap

External links
 Indiana Township Association
 United Township Association of Indiana
 City-Data.com page for Green Township

Townships in Marshall County, Indiana
Townships in Indiana